Home is an Australian children's television series first broadcast on the ABC on 11 April 1983. It follows the stories and adventures of children living at the fictional Westmere children's home. The series featured a revolving cast with story arcs running across two to six episodes, although some characters appeared in more than one story arc.

Production
Home was written by Graeme Farmer and directed by Richard Sarell, Walter Boston, Noel Price and Douglas Sharp. It was the biggest production to come from the network's children's unit at the time, and featured more than 400 young actors in the cast. The series is set in a community of welfare cottages and centres on the children who come to live there.

Broadcast
The series aired on ABC Monday to Friday in a 6:00 pm timeslot. The last episode aired on 24 May 1983.

In the United Kingdom, the series was first screened in 1983 on ITV in the Children's ITV segment and then repeated in 1985. It was also screened in a number of European countries.

Reception
Jacqueline Lee Lewis of The Sun-Herald praised the series, calling it "wonderful". She wrote "The concept is an interesting one, it's believable (thank goodness, after all those soapies) and it's well acted." Lewis said that with such a large cast it was hard to name everyone who deserved "a gold medal" for their performances, but mentioned Lea Steventon, Darren Sole, Paul Spano, Lisa Potasz, Ian Turnnidge and Cindy Unkauf. She also praised the older actors Bill Garner, Christine Amor and Robert Meldrum. Brian Courtis from The Age called Home a "realistic, well-scripted ABC drama".

References

External links
  
 Home at the Australian Television Information Archive

1983 Australian television series debuts
1983 Australian television series endings
Australian Broadcasting Corporation original programming
Australian children's television series
English-language television shows
Television series produced by The Reg Grundy Organisation